EGTA may refer to:

 EGTA (chemical), the chelating agent ethylene glycol tetraacetic acid
 EGTA (advertising), the European Group of Television Advertising